Claudine Douville is a Québécoise sports journalist, amateur athlete and author of adventure novels.

Early life and education

Claudine Douville was born in Montréal. Passionate about sports from her youth, radio broadcasts of ice hockey games inspired her career in sports journalism. She holds a BA in journalism from Laval University with minors in physical education and theatre.

Career
In 1980, she was hired by TVSQ (Télévision des sports du Québec, which was later replaced by Réseau des sports (RDS). She has been working as a sports journalist and columnist since 1989. She is the host of Plein air sans limites (English: Outdoor without limits).

Douville has covered major sporting events, such as the Olympic Games. She also provides commentary on many disciplines, including soccer at the World Cup and Champions League matches. In 2008, along with three other women, she gave play-by-play commentary at a National Hockey League match.

Douville has written several adventure novels. The first, La Louve des mers published in 2008, features the eighteenth-century adventures of Marie Galligan, and was successful enough to have a sequel the following year, Le Loup des îles, which completed the story.  Douville did research in Montana for her third novel, Une Histoire de cowboy (A Cowboy Story, 2010).

Private life
Douville practices scuba diving, karate, alpine skiing, kayaking, fencing and mountaineering. She climbed Mount Kilimanjaro and to Everest Base Camp. The journalist has taken part in several rally raids (long-distance off-road races), including the all-female Raid Amazones. With Louise Bergeron, she won the 2002 edition of the Rallye Aicha des Gazelles in Morocco.

Married, she is the mother of three children. Weakened by celiac disease, she says she evokes the subject in order to "show to those who suffer from it that, if it sometimes complicates life, that does not prevent anything".

Awards
In 2011, Douville was admitted to the hall of fame of the Club de la médaille d'or (English: Gold Medal Club) for her contributions to the promotion of amateur sport in Quebec. Inducted alongside her were Guy Lafleur and Marc Gagnon.

Selected works
Novels

Mission sacrée (Holy Mission) trilogy:

References

Living people
French Quebecers
Writers from Montreal
Université Laval alumni
Canadian television hosts
Canadian sports journalists
Canadian women journalists
Canadian novelists in French
Canadian women non-fiction writers
Year of birth missing (living people)
Canadian women television hosts
Quebec Nordiques announcers
National Hockey League broadcasters
North American Soccer League (1968–1984) commentators
Canadian non-fiction writers in French
Canadian women novelists